8 Andromedae, abbreviated 8 And, is a probable triple star system in the northern constellation of Andromeda. 8 Andromedae is the Flamsteed designation. It is visible to the naked eye with an apparent visual magnitude of 4.82. It is moving closer with a heliocentric radial velocity of −8 km/s.

The suffix notation indicates this is a mild barium star, which means the stellar atmosphere is enriched with s-process elements. It is either a member of a close binary system and has previously acquired these elements from a (now) white dwarf companion or else it is on the asymptotic giant branch and is generating the elements itself. This is a periodic variable of unknown type, changing in brightness with an amplitude of 0.0161 magnitude at a frequency of 0.23354 d−1, or once every 4.3 days.

The third component is the magnitude 13.0 star at an angular separation of  along a position angle of 164°, as of 2015. A number of other faint stars within a few arc-minutes of 8 Andromedae have been listed as companions, but none are at the same distance.

Within Andromeda it is the second of a northerly chain asterism – 11 is further south-westward, with 7, 5, then 3 Andromedae in the other direction.

References

M-type giants
Suspected variables
Barium stars
Triple stars
08 Andromedae
Durchmusterung objects
Andromedae, 08
219734
115022
8860